NGC 5921 is a barred spiral galaxy located approximately 65 million light-years from the Solar System in the constellation Serpens Caput. It was discovered by William Herschel on 1 May 1786. In February 2001 a type II supernova (SN 2001X) was discovered in NGC 5921. It is a member of the Virgo III Groups, a series of galaxies and galaxy clusters strung out to the east of the Virgo Supercluster of galaxies.

See also
 Spiral Galaxy NGC 1300
 List of NGC objects (5001–6000)

References

External links
 
 
 SEDS
 NOAO: NGC 5921 

Barred spiral galaxies
Serpens (constellation)
5921
09824
54849
Discoveries by William Herschel